Takeshi Yasutoko (born June 25, 1986 in Kobe) is a Japanese professional vert skater. In 1995 Takeshi became the youngest professional Vert Skater to turn pro at the age of nine, since that day he has won many gold medals in most of the competitions he attends.

His brother is professional vert skater Eito Yasutoko.

Best Tricks: Frontside 1080 McTwist, Double Viking Flip.

Vert Competitions 
2022 World Skate Games, Buenos Aires, Argentina - Roller Freestyle Vert: Gold
2016 British inline championship, Corby UK - Vert : 1st place
2014 Asian X Games, Shanghai, China - Vert: Gold
2013 Asian X Games, Shanghai, China - Vert: Silver
2012 Asian X Games, Shanghai, China - Vert: Gold
2011 Asian X Games, Shanghai, China - Vert: Gold
2010 Asian X Games, Shanghai, China - Vert: Gold
2008 Asian X Games, Shanghai - Vert: 1st
2007 LG Action Sports World Championships, Dallas, TX - Vert: Gold Medalist
2007 Action Sports World Tour, San Diego, CA - Vert: 1st
2007 Nokia Fise, Montpellier, France - Vert: 1st
2007 Asian X Games, Shanghai - Vert: 1st
2006 LG Action Sports World Championships, Dallas, TX - Vert: 1st
2006 Action Sports US Vert Championship, San Diego, CA - Vert: 1st
2006 LG Action Sports World Tour, Paris, France - Vert: 1st
2006 LG Action Sports World Tour, Berlin, Germany - Vert: 3rd
2006 LG Action Sports World Tour, Birmingham, England - Vert: 2nd
2006 LG Action Sports World Tour, Amsterdam, Netherlands - Vert: 1st
2006 Action Sports World Tour, Richmond, VA - Vert: 1st
2006 Asian X Games, Kuala Lumpur, Malaysia - Vert: 2nd
2005 LG Action Sports World Championship, Manchester, England - Vert: 2nd
2005 LG Action Sports US Championship, Pomona, CA - Vert: 1st
2005 LG Action Sports Tour, Moscow, Russia - Vert: 10th
2005 LG Action Sports Tour, Munich, Germany - Vert: 1st
2005 Mobile Skatepark Series, Cincinnati, OH: 1st
2004 Pro Tour Year-End Ranking (Vert): 1st
2004 LG Action Sports Asian Tour, Shanghai & Seoul: 1st, Beijing, China: 2nd
2004 LG Action Sports Championships - World Championships - Vert: 1st
2004 X Games - Vert: Gold Medalist
2004 Asian X Games - Vert: Gold Medalist
2003 Pro Tour Year-End Ranking (Vert): 3rd
2003 X Games - Vert: Silver Medalist
2003 AIL - Vert: 1
2002 Pro Tour Year-End Ranking (Vert): 1st
2002 X Games - Vert: Gold Medalist
2001 ASA World Championships - Vert: Silver Medalist
2001 Gravity Games - Vert: Silver Medalist
2001 X Games - Vert: Silver Medalist
2000 Pro Tour Year-End Ranking (Vert): 2nd
1999 AIL - Vert: 8
1999 AIL - Vert Triples: 3
1998 AIL - Vert: 14
1998 AIL - Vert Triples: 5

References

Guinness world records: The Youngest X GAMES athlete ever is Takeshi Yasutoko who was 11 years 360 days old when he made his X GAMES debut on 20 June 1998.

External links

kiaxgamesasia.com
inlineskating.about.com
grindtv.com
espn.go.com
fr.wikipedia.org

1986 births
Living people
Vert skaters
X Games athletes